Robert O'Neil "Bob" Forrest (born February 15, 1961) is an American musician who is best known for his work with the Los Angeles bands Thelonious Monster and The Bicycle Thief. Forrest, a recovering drug addict, has worked for years as a recovery advocate and is cofounder of Oro House Recovery Center. He currently hosts podcasts called "Rehab Bob" and "The Don't Die podcast". Forrest is the former Chemical Dependency Program Director at Las Encinas Hospital. In 2010, he and co-founder Shelly Sprague launched Hollywood Recovery Services.

In September 2006 he released his first solo album, Modern Folk and Blues Wednesday. He is also a drug counselor, appearing alongside Dr. Drew Pinsky on Celebrity Rehab and Sober House. He contributed the song "Moonshiner" to the I'm Not There soundtrack.

Forrest was good friends with River Phoenix, whose overdose death affected Forrest deeply.

In 2008, he began releasing a series of live digital  EPs exclusively at his official website. In 2010, Forrest began hosting a weekly radio show, All Up In The Interweb, airing Wednesday nights on Indie1031.com.

On October 1, 2013, Forrest released Running with Monsters: A Memoir which he co-wrote with author Mike Albo.

Forrest is the subject of Bob and the Monster, a documentary about his music career and battles with drug addiction. The documentary was released in March 2011 and continues to play on the film festival circuit. The DVD was released in September 2013.

Forrest released a new album, Survival Songs, on October 9, 2015 which was produced by Grammy-winning producer, Ian Brennan.  It is a folk album featuring new material and folk versions of existing Thelonious Monster and Bicycle Thief songs.

After Keith Levene parted ways with John Lydon, Forrest featured on one of his records, singing on the track "I'm Looking For Something."

References

External links
Official music website
Alo House Recovery Centers
Rehab Bob

1961 births
Living people
American rock singers
Musicians from Los Angeles
Six Degrees Records artists